Florida SouthWestern State College  (FSW or Florida SouthWestern) is a public college with its main campus in Fort Myers, Florida. It is part of the Florida College System. The college has satellite campuses in Charlotte County and Collier County, and outreach programs in Hendry County and Glades County.

FSW was founded in 1962 as Edison Junior College, named after Thomas Edison, and was subsequently renamed Edison Community College in 1972, Edison College in 2004, Edison State College in 2008, and Florida SouthWestern State College in 2014.

History
Florida SouthWestern State College, originally known as Edison Junior College, admitted its first students in the fall of 1962. The college was named after the inventor and industrialist Thomas Edison who frequently wintered in Fort Myers. The Lee Campus (now known as the Thomas Edison Campus) opened in 1965 on an 80-acre site with three buildings. The school's nursing program began on campus with a $50,000 donation in 1968.

The college's name changed to Edison Community College in 1972, shortly after the first nursing class graduated. Ten years later, in 1982, a branch campus of the University of South Florida was dedicated. The college's primary arts center, the Barbara B. Mann Performing Arts Hall, opened in 1986 and serves as the premier Performing Arts venue in Lee County.

Construction on the Collier County Campus at Lely lasted from 1991 to 1992, on a  site in Naples, Florida. Soon after that, the Charlotte County Campus opened in 1997, on a  plot of land in Punta Gorda, Florida. This is the largest campus to date. The college revised its mission by publishing a new strategic plan, The Decade of Promise, in 2002. The college again changed its name in 2004, to simply Edison College.

The college continued to expand through the 2000s with increased funding for the nursing program and the new Richard H. Rush Library on the Lee Campus. In 2008, the college saw its fourth name change to Edison State College, and a new torch logo with blue and yellow colors to reflect the college's new status as a baccalaureate-granting state college. Multiple new baccalaureate programs opened over the next decade, including Middle Grades Mathematics, Sciences, and Language Arts Education; Applied Science in Public Safety Management; Elementary Education; and Secondary Education Biology and Mathematics.

The name, logo, and colors were changed for the fifth and most recent time in 2014. This name broke ties to Thomas Edison, who was the college's former namesake. The new name, Florida SouthWestern State College, was created in response to reflect the wide geographic region the college serves. Another reason for the change was to avoid confusion with Thomas Edison State College of New Jersey due to new online courses with a nationwide reach.

Academics

FSW offers 21 associate degree, 5 bachelor's degree, and 18 certificate programs, with an emphasis on healthcare, business, technology, and education programs. The college also enrolls more than 3,500 dual enrollment students each year. Non-credit continuing education courses are also offered. FSW is accredited by the Commission on Colleges of the Southern Association of Colleges and Schools.

Students
Enrollment – 16,576 (Fall 2018)
Full-time – 36.5%; Part-time – 63.5%
75.2% of students are 24 years old or younger, 24.8% of students are over the age of 24
Female - 63.2%; Male - 36.6%
43.9% White, 33.6% Hispanic/Latino, 11.9% African American, and 4.9% other minorities
Dual enrollment students represent 19.4% of the total fall enrollment.

Athletics
Florida SouthWestern State College resumed its athletics program in 2015 after having been discontinued in 1997. The teams continued to be known once again as the Buccaneers.  For the inaugural season, the school fielded teams in softball, baseball, men's and women's basketball, and women's volleyball. The teams participate in the Suncoast Conference of the Florida State College Activities Association within the National Junior College Athletic Association.

On November 29, 2016, the new on-campus Suncoast Credit Union Arena opened.  With a seating capacity of 3,500, it is home to the basketball and volleyball teams, as well as the new home of the City of Palms Classic high school basketball tournament. The arena has also held other basketball events, including Fort Myers Tip Off and concerts.

The baseball and softball team play at the City Of Palms Park, which was home of the Boston Red Sox spring training games from 1993 to 2011.

Campuses

The campus consists of 24 permanent buildings, including one- and two-story classroom buildings, a library, a bookstore, a cafeteria, a student center, and laboratories for science, computer science, nursing, health technologies, and college preparatory classes. Florida SouthWestern Collegiate High School - Lee is located on this campus. The collegiate high school is a dual-enrollment based program allowing students to earn an associate degree at the same time as a high school diploma.

The Barbara B. Mann Performing Arts Hall, opened in 1986, is located on the Thomas Edison Campus and hosts plays, shows, and concerts. The Edison Pops Concert Series is held there annually.

Also located on the Fort Myers, Florida Edison campus, the Gallery of Fine Art was renamed the Bob Rauschenberg Gallery, on June 4, 2004, celebrating a long time association with artist Robert Rauschenberg.[47] The gallery has been host to many of the artist's exhibitions since 1980.[48]

The Collier County campus is a  site off State Road 951 in east Naples. The Collier campus opened in 1992.

The Charlotte County campus is located on a wooded site on Airport Road in Punta Gorda. The Charlotte campus opened in 1997. It also has a collegiate high school, which was the first collegiate high school in Florida to accept ninth graders.

The Hendry/Glades Center outreach program campus is located on Cowboy Way in LaBelle.

Notable alumni
 Charles Ghigna, poet and children's author
 Matt Hudson, member of the Florida House of Representatives
 Mike Scott, former Lee County, Florida sheriff
 Tina Wainscott, romance and suspense novelist
 Fuzzy Zoeller, professional golfer, currently plays on the Champions Tour

References

External links

Athletics website

Buildings and structures in Fort Myers, Florida
Education in Collier County, Florida
Education in Lee County, Florida
Education in Charlotte County, Florida
Educational institutions established in 1962
Florida College System
Two-year colleges in the United States
Universities and colleges accredited by the Southern Association of Colleges and Schools
1962 establishments in Florida